The Boring Company (TBC) is an American infrastructure and tunnel construction services company founded by Elon Musk. Its ongoing and proposed projects are designed for intra-city ("loop") transit systems, which are all-electric, zero-emissions, and high-speed underground public transportation systems that shuttle passengers to their destination without an intermediary stop.

After six years, TBC has completed one out of six publicly announced projects. The only operational one is situated inside the Las Vegas convention center (LVCC) and operates on limited days for loop travel during conventions. It connects the LVCC West Hall to the existing campus over a stretch of 1.7 miles with an average speed of 30mph in non-autonomous regular Tesla 3 cars that are steered by a driver, despite a promise to have 150mph average speeds and autonomous "sleek custom pods". The TBC completed one tunnel for testing in Los Angeles County, California. During the opening of the test tunnel at the end of 2018, it was described as "just a regular Tesla driving through a paved tunnel". Many other TBC projects have been announced and subsequently became inactive or were cancelled. Proposed projects in Los Angeles, Chicago, and Baltimore were ultimately scrapped due to escalating cost calculations by TBC and inactivity by TBC. The Wall Street Journal described the lack of follow up from TBC as "ghosting American cities". 

The Boring Company was formed as a subsidiary of SpaceX, before separating in 2018. As of December 2018, 90% of the equity was owned by Musk, with 6% held by SpaceX in return for the use of SpaceX resources during the startup of the company. Outside investments during 2019 changed the equity split.

History 

Musk announced the existence of the Boring Company in December 2016. Musk cited difficulty with Los Angeles traffic, and what he sees as limitations of its two-dimensional transportation network, as his early inspiration for the project. The Boring Company was formed as a SpaceX subsidiary. According to Musk, the company's goal is to enhance tunneling speed enough such that establishing a tunnel network is financially feasible. The company claims that future boring operations will implement simultaneous boring and tunnel reinforcement to reduce cost, in addition to reducing tunnel size, reusing soil materials for tunnel construction, and further technological improvements.

In early 2018, the Boring Company was spun out from SpaceX and into a separate corporate entity. Somewhat less than 10% of equity was given to early employees, and over 90% to Elon Musk. Subsequent concerns by SpaceX shareholders resulted in a December 2018 reallocation of 6% of the Boring Company's equity to SpaceX.

TBC provided an update on the state of their technology and product line in December 2018 when they opened to the public their first  test tunnel in Hawthorne, California. In July 2019, the Boring Company sold US$120 million in stock to venture capital firms, after raising $113 million in non-outside capital during 2018.

By November 2019, Steve Davis had become company president after leading efforts for Musk since 2016. Davis was one of the earliest hires at SpaceX (in 2003) and has twin master's degrees in particle physics and aerospace engineering.

On April 20, 2022, the company announced an additional $675 million Series C funding round, valuing the company at approximately $5.675 billion. The round was led by Vy Capital and Sequoia Capital, with participation from Valor Equity Partners, Founders Fund, 8VC, Craft Ventures, and DFJ Growth. Additionally, several real estate partners joined the round, including Brookfield, Lennar, Tishman Speyer, and Dacra. The company said that the funds from this round would be used to "significantly increase hiring across engineering, operations, and production to build and scale Loop projects, including Vegas Loop and others, in addition to accelerating the research and development of Prufrock and future products."

Boring machines 

The company's first machine was Godot, a conventional TBM made by Lovat. Its second, Line-storm, was a modified conventional boring machine.

The company's third machine, Prufrock, was designed and built by TBC and was under development by May 2018. Prufrock is named after "The Love Song of J. Alfred Prufrock" by T. S. Eliot.

In 2018, the company claimed it would support a 15x improvement in tunneling speed over the 2017 state of the art. In 2021, TBC stated that Prufrock would tunnel six times faster than Godot. However, in the event, Prufrock achieved tunneling rates of 49 ft/day, similar to conventional machines.

Tunnels

Completed and in-progress 
The Boring Company has completed tunnels in Hawthorne, California and Winchester, Nevada.

Hawthorne test tunnel 

The project opened to the public on December 18, 2018, showcasing a Tesla Model X used in the tunnel.

In September 2018 the City of Hawthorne announced that a test spur and elevator had been proposed near the intersection of 120th Street and Hawthorne Boulevard. The elevator spur would enable engineering tests. According to planning documents, those tests would consist of:

 an automotive vehicle driven onto a "skate" above ground, 
 the engine turned off, 
 the vehicle (with passengers inside) lowered into the tunnel spur, 
 moving the vehicle (possibly on the skate) through the tunnel, 
 raising the vehicle on a skate to the surface at the other end of the test track, near SpaceX.

Las Vegas Convention Center

Convention center 
In March 2019, the Las Vegas Convention and Visitors Authority (LVCVA) recommended TBC for a system to shuttle visitors in a loop underneath the Las Vegas Convention Center (LVCC). In May 2019, the company won a $48.7 million project to do so. Construction started in October. The project in the end used two Prufrock machines. The second was assembled and brought online in August 2021.

The tunnel was unveiled in mid-April 2021. The service was described as "embarrassing" and "lame", due to comparisons with earlier promises of "electric autonomous vehicles with alignment wheels".

Testing with volunteers in late May 2021 showed the system could transport 4,400 passengers per hour, though the highest traffic the LVCC Loop has transported in an uncontrolled setting was reached in July 2021 at 1,355 passengers per hour. The system started transporting attendees of a convention center exhibition on June 8, 2021. The target was to reduce a 25-minute walk to a 2-minute ride, but additional data revealed in November 2021 demonstrated that the average trip time in any day had never been less than 3 minutes. In January 2022, video taken during CES 2022 captured a traffic jam at the LVCC.

Private tunnels to convention center 

In June 2020 two Las Vegas strip hotels, Encore and Resorts World Las Vegas, applied for permits for TBC to dig private tunnels to allow direct access between the hotels and LVCC.

, the tunnel to Resorts World had broken ground, and the tunnel to Encore had been approved.

, the tunnel surfaced in Resorts World. Currently, the Resorts World connector is in its final phase of construction and will provide a direct connection between Resorts World on the Las Vegas strip and the multiple exhibition halls at the Las Vegas Convention Center.

Resort corridor 

In October 2021, Clark County Commissioners approved a 50-year franchise agreement for a 51-stop, mostly-underground system, a "15-mile dual loop system ... operating mainly in the Resort Corridor with stations at various resorts and connections to Allegiant Stadium and the UNLV [University of Nevada, Las Vegas]" according to Mick Akers of the Las Vegas Review-Journal. The county approved the route, but separate land use permits for the stops, and City approval for the underground portions were required. TBC planned to build five to ten stations during the first year, and then add approximately 15 stations per year thereafter. The Boring Company would be responsible for funding the tunnel, while station costs would be funded by the resort properties and land owners.

Projects under discussion 
Inquiries and discussions have been held with Boring Company for various projects.

In February 2019, San Jose, California mayor Sam Liccardo announced that he had held talks with the Boring Company regarding a link between San Jose International Airport and Diridon station, as an alternative to a traditional rail link that had been quoted at $800 million. San Jose has released two requests for information: one for the airport/Diridon station route and another that "would run along the Stevens Creek corridor, a busy thoroughfare that connects downtown to Cupertino, about a dozen miles west."

In February 2021, Miami, Florida mayor Francis X. Suarez revealed that Musk had proposed to dig a two-mile tunnel under the Miami River for $30 million, within a six-month timescale, compared with $1 billion over four years estimated by the local transit authority. Much of the savings would be achieved by simplifying ventilation systems and allowing only electric vehicles.

Also in February, the San Bernardino County Transportation Authority in California approved beginning contract negotiations with TBC to build a nearly  tunnel connecting the Ontario airport with the Rancho Cucamonga Metrolink train station.

In July 2021, Fort Lauderdale, Florida accepted a proposal from the Boring Company for a tunnel between downtown and the beach, to be dubbed the "Las Olas Loop". Other companies had 45 days to submit competitive proposals, but the two bids submitted within the timeframe were disqualified for not meeting the requirements. As of August 2021, the city was beginning final negotiations with TBC. Mayor Dean Trantalis estimated the total cost of the  round-trip tunnel would be between $90 and $100 million, including stations.

In August 2021, a preliminary concept discussion was held with officials of Cameron County on the potential construction of a tunnel from South Padre Island to Boca Chica Beach in South Texas.

Inactive/cancelled projects

United States

Baltimore–Washington Loop 
In July 2017, Musk announced plans to build a Hyperloop tunnel connecting Washington, DC and New York City. He initially stated that the project had "verbal government approval", but government officials disputed this claim and Musk later clarified that he lacked formal approval.

In March 2018, a route between Washington, DC and downtown Baltimore, following the Baltimore–Washington Parkway, was announced . The proposed tunnel would use the company's "Loop" concept, carrying passengers or vehicles on electric "skates".

In April 2019, a draft Environmental Assessment for the project was published by the Federal Highway Administration. The proposed system would include autonomous electric vehicles (AEVs), main artery tunnels, loop stations, ventilation shafts, four TBM launch shafts, and maintenance terminals for vehicle charging and maintenance. The proposed system appeared to not meet key safety requirements such as the number of emergency exits. However, National Fire Protection Association standards allow alternative solutions to be proposed if a risk-based assessment demonstrates that they are equivalent or superior to the stated methods, subject to specific approval.

In early 2021, the Boring Company no longer listed the Hyperloop project on its website. A Federal Highway Administration spokesman said that TBC had not indicated that it would pursue the project.

Chicago 
In March 2018, a competition to build a high-speed link from downtown Chicago to the soon-to-be-expanded O'Hare Airport was reduced to two bidders. The Boring Company was selected in June 2018 and was to work on a contract to be presented to the Chicago City Council. Construction was to be entirely financed by TBC, which would then maintain and operate the system. The system would transport passengers in electric vans carrying 16 passengers and their luggage through parallel tunnels running under existing public way alignments, traveling from Block 37 to the airport in 12 minutes, at speeds reaching , with pods departing as often as every 30 seconds.

Several local politicians and civic groups criticized the proposed project as unnecessary, for its environmental impacts, for its unproven technology, and for a lack of transparency. At a forum of mayoral candidates in January 2019, most expressed reservations about the project. In June 2021, a spokesperson for the Chicago Department of Transportation said the plan had been dropped.

Los Angeles westside tunnel 
In May 2018, TBC announced a concept to develop a second privately funded tunnel in the Los Angeles area: a  test tunnel on a north–south alignment parallel to Interstate 405 and adjacent to Sepulveda Boulevard in Los Angeles, near the junction with Interstate 10. It was to be a single-tunnel shaft on private property. It was not to be used for public transportation, but for experimentation. The goal of the experimentation included public customer feedback to help the company learn so that they could submit more complete and better information to the California environmental regulator for a long-lead-time Environmental Impact Assessment for the broader loop tunnel transportation system that might be designed for the Los Angeles area.

Subsequently, public opposition and lawsuits emerged, and in November 2018, TBC gave up.

Los Angeles Dugout Loop 
In August 2018, a proposal to build a  tunnel called the "Dugout Loop" in Los Angeles was first publicly discussed. The tunnel would extend from Vermont Avenue to Dodger Stadium. The project would be a public-private partnership, and was anticipated to require 14 months to complete. Also in August 2018, the City of Los Angeles published a study and environmental checklist for the proposed project, along with a list of the sixteen California public regulatory agencies that would oversee and permit various aspects of the project. , the project had not advanced and had been removed from TBC's website.

Australia 
Tunneling experts dismissed these numbers as "totally out of the ballpark", and Transport for NSW estimated $3 billion for a road tunnel or $6 billion for combined road-rail.

Promotional merchandise 

In 2018, the company began to engage in a number of marketing promotions and offered several types of promotional merchandise to consumers. To date, these have included hats, fire extinguishers, and "flamethrowers".

The company began its consumer sales by offering 50,000 hats. When the hats sold out in January 2018, it began offering 20,000 "flamethrowers" for preordering. The "flamethrower" was a blow torch shaped to look like a gun and is legal to use in all U.S. states except Maryland. The promotion attracted criticism. Politician Miguel Santiago introduced legislation that would ban sales of the device in California. In just a few days, all 20,000 "flamethrowers" were sold, but after customs officials said that they would not allow any items called 'flamethrowers', Musk announced that he would rename them to "Not-A-Flamethrower" and subsequently updated the website where it stated that it is the "world's safest flamethrower". Musk also announced separate sales of a fire extinguisher, which he described as "overpriced... but this one comes with a cool sticker".

Student tunnel-boring competition 

In 2020, TBC released rules for a student tunnel-boring competition. A competition was held in Las Vegas in September 2021. Officially named the Not-a-Boring Competition, the challenge was to "quickly and accurately drill a tunnel that was -long and -wide." SpaceX had earlier sponsored a Hyperloop pod competition in 2016–2019 for student teams, and had considered building a longer vacuum tube for a potential competition in 2020, but they also began exploring holding a competition for building the tunnel itself.

Applications were received from 400 potential participants. A technical design review reduced the number to 12 teams. Those teams were invited to Las Vegas to demonstrate their engineering solution for increasing the speed of automated boring of a small-diameter tunnel. The winning team was TUM Boring from Technical University of Munich who managed to excavate a  bore while meeting the requisite safety requirements. TUM Boring used a conventional pipe jacking method to build the tunnel, but employed a novel revolving pipe storage design to minimize downtime between pipe segments.

Criticism 
A number of civil engineering experts and tunneling industry veterans questioned whether Musk can render tunnels more quickly and cheaply than competitors. Tunnelling Journal dismissed the company as a “vanity project” that was inconsistent in its promised offerings. The much-hyped tunnel project constructed at the Las Vegas Convention Center turned out to be a single-lane underground roadway less than a mile long, driven by conventional Tesla automobiles, constructed at a total cost of $48 million. Musk's planned tunnels were criticized for lacking such safety features as emergency exit corridors, ventilation systems, or fire suppression. In addition, the tunnels themselves are projected to be single lane, making it impossible for vehicles to pass one another in the event of collision, mechanical failure, or other traffic obstruction, and instead would shut the entire tunnel section down.

Critics have argued that the low capacity of the Boring Company's projects make them inefficient and less equitable than existing public transit solutions, with only a fraction of the capacity of a conventional rapid-transit subway. Musk was criticized for his 2017 comments disparaging public transit.

James Moore, director of transportation engineering at the University of Southern California, said that "there are cheaper ways to provide better transportation for large numbers of people", such as managing traffic with tolls. Public transit consultant Jarrett Walker called TBC "wildly hyped", and criticized how the company that "dazzled city governments and investors with visions of an efficient subway where you never have to get out of your car, turns out to be a paved road tunnel."

See also 
 Underground construction

References

External links 
 
 
  55 minutes, video of information session on the vision of the Boring Company and the project in Los Angeles, with Q&A

 
2016 establishments in California
Companies based in Los Angeles County, California
Hyperloop
Privately held companies based in California
Subterranean excavating equipment companies
Hawthorne, California
American companies established in 2016
Elon Musk